This is a list of electoral results for the South Western Province in Victorian state elections.

Members for South Western Province

Election results

Elections in the 1970s

Elections in the 1960s

 This by-election was caused by the death of Gordon McArthur.

Elections in the 1950s

References

Victoria (Australia) state electoral results by district